Benjamin Frank Whelchel (December 16, 1895 – May 11, 1954) was a U.S. Representative from Georgia.

Born in Lumpkin County, near Gainesville, Georgia, Whelchel attended the public schools.
He studied law privately in Gainesville, Georgia.  He was admitted to the bar in 1925 and commenced the practice of law in Gainesville, Georgia.  He served as judge of the city court of Hall County 1932–1934.

Whelchel was elected as a Democrat to the Seventy-fourth and to the four succeeding Congresses (January 3, 1935 – January 3, 1945).  He was not a candidate for renomination in 1944.  He resumed the practice of law.  He died in Gainesville, Georgia, May 11, 1954.  He was interred in West View Abbey, Atlanta, Georgia.

References

1895 births
1954 deaths
People from Gainesville, Georgia
Georgia (U.S. state) state court judges
Georgia (U.S. state) lawyers
Democratic Party members of the United States House of Representatives from Georgia (U.S. state)
20th-century American judges
20th-century American politicians
20th-century American lawyers